Rose O'Salem-Town is a 1910 silent short drama film directed by D. W. Griffith.

The story takes place in Salem, Massachusetts, during the era of the Witch Trials.

Cast
Dorothy West - A Sea Child
Clara T. Bracy - The Sea Child's Mother
Henry B. Walthall - The Trapper
George Nichols - The Puritan

uncredited
William J. Butler - Judge
Verner Clarges - Judge
Edward Dillon - A Puritan
Gladys Egan - Little Child
Frank Evans - Judge
Francis J. Grandon - Captor
Gey Hedlund - Indian
Arthur V. Johnson - 
Henry Lehrman - Captor
Marion Leonard -
Charles Hill Mailes - Indian/Puritan

See also
 List of American films of 1910

References

External links
 Rose O'Salem-Town @ IMDb.com

excerpt of Rose O'Salem Town available for free download at Internet Archive
Rose O'Salem Town on the Youtube from EYE Nederlands

1910 films
Films directed by D. W. Griffith
American silent short films
Salem, Massachusetts
Films set in Massachusetts
Biograph Company films
Silent American drama films
1910 short films
1910 drama films
American black-and-white films
Films about witchcraft
1910s American films
Silent horror films
1910s English-language films